Gallium sulfide may refer to:

 Gallium(III) sulfide, Ga2S3
 Gallium(II) sulfide, GaS